Heavy Equipment Transporter System (HETS) is the name of a U.S. Army logistics vehicle transport system, the primary purpose of which is to transport the M1 Abrams tank. It is also used to transport, deploy, and evacuate armored personnel carriers, self-propelled artillery, armored bulldozers, and other heavy vehicles and equipment.

The current U.S. Army vehicle used in this role is an Oshkosh-built M1070 tractor unit in A0 and A1 configurations which is coupled to a DRS Technologies M1000 semi-trailer. This combination replaced the earlier Oshkosh-built M911 tractor unit and M747 semi-trailer.

M1070 and M1000 

To meet a US Army requirement for the transport of the M1 Abrams series main battle tank (MBT) Oshkosh Truck Corporation, now Oshkosh Defense, proposed the M1070. A contract for 1,044 M1070s was placed, with production commencing in July 1992. The final U.S. Army contract for the original A0 version called for 195 vehicles. These were delivered between March 2001 and March 2003. A total of 2,488 A0 versions were delivered to the U.S. Army. Following extensive use, some M1070s have been reset to the original build standard by Oshkosh.

The M1070E1 model was developed in the mid-1990s in conjunction with the U.S. Army as a possible Technology Insertion Program (TIP) for the M1070. No orders were placed.

In March 2008, Oshkosh Defense announced a contract award from the U.S. Army to begin engineering and initial production of the next-generation of HET. Oshkosh announced in October 2010 its first delivery order for the M1070A1 HET. Production of the M1070A1 concluded in August 2014, with 1,591 new vehicles built.

The M1000 trailer is used with the M1070A0 and M1070A1 tractors. The M1000 was originally developed as a private venture by Southwest Mobile Systems, later Systems & Electronics Inc (SEI), now DRS Technologies, as a response to a possible US Army requirement for transporting M1 and M1A1 MBTs. A production order for 1,066 M1000 units was placed by the U.S. Army in 1989. By July 2009 more than 2,600 M1000 trailers had been ordered.
The M1070 and M1000 are both air-transportable by C-5 Galaxy or C-17 Globemaster III aircraft.
The M1070 replaced the Scammell Commander as the British Army heavy tank transporter in 2001. The UK version (M1070F) is compliant with European legislation on emissions (EURO III).

Previous Heavy Equipment Transports

M25 Tank Transporter 

The M25 Tank Transporter was a heavy tank transporter and tank recovery vehicle used in World War II and beyond by the US Army. Nicknamed the Dragon Wagon, the M25 was composed of a 6×6 armored tractor (M26) and 40-ton trailer (M15).

M746/M747 - M911/M747 

Prior to 1993, the U.S. Army employed the Commercial Heavy Equipment Transporter (C-HET), which consisted of either the M746 or the M911 truck tractor and the M747 semitrailer.

The M746 was an 8×8, 22-ton tractor built by Ward LaFrance from 1975 to 1977. Approximately 125-185 were built.
The lift axle, 8×6, Oshkosh M911 superseded the M746 after 1977.

During Operations Desert Shield and Desert Storm the M911 vehicles were employed primarily to haul M1 Abrams tanks. However, they demonstrated poor durability when loads exceeded 60 tons. Some are still serving as heavy transports of other military equipment, such as cargo handling equipment.

General Characteristics

Operators

See also 
List of U.S. military vehicles by model number
Dragon Wagon (disambiguation)
SLT 50 Elefant
Actros Armoured Heavy Support Vehicle System
Shipyard transporter

References

External links 

Project Details of the Oshkosh 1070F
US Army Fact File M1070 Heavy Equipment Transporter
Oshkosh Corporation Website 
Oshkosh Corporation Defense Website; M1070A1 page

Military trucks of the United States
Military vehicles introduced in the 1990s
Oshkosh vehicles
Tank transporters